Bible of a Pimp is a compilation by Too Short. It is a 2002 rerelease of his independent CDs from 1983 & 85 with a bonus DVD.

Track list

Disc 1
 Invasion of the Flat Booty Bitches
 She's a Bitch
 Bitch Sucks Dick
 Blowjob Betty
 Short Side
 Playboy Short
 From Here to New York
 Girl (That's Your Life)
 Coke Dealers

Disc 2
 Female Funk
 Oakland California
 Don't Stop Rappin
 Shortrapp
 Wild Wild West
 Every Time
 Dance (Don't Geek)
 Don't Ever Stop
 Players

BONUS DVD: 
Exclusive Interviews

2007 compilation albums
Too Short albums
Albums produced by Jazze Pha
Albums produced by Lil Jon
Albums produced by will.i.am